Single-photon may refer to:

 Photon counting devices capable of counting individual photons, for example:
 Superconducting nanowire single-photon detectors
 Single-photon avalanche diodes, a class of solid-state photodetectors
 Single-photon sources
 Single-photon emission computed tomography, a nuclear medicine tomographic imaging technique